Lambrini is a light and fruity perry or pear cider that was created by Halewood Artisinal Spirits in 1994. It has been owned by Accolade Wines since June 2021. Lambrini dominates the British commercial perry market, with a 53.6% market share in the off trade.

Varieties

Lambrini is available in Original (6% ABV), Luci (3.5% ABV), Cherry, Peach and Strawberry (all 5% ABV). A 2009 study on alcohol sold in supermarkets and off licences in North East England identified Lambrini as the cheapest alcohol in the wine category, measured on the price of a unit of alcohol.

Production for a bottle of Lambrini takes about six weeks.

Lambrini has on occasion been accused of deliberate confusion with other wine and perry manufacturers' products beginning with "Lam", such as Lambrusco. Around 2018 Lambrini's alcohol content was reduced to 6.8%, and in early 2020 Lambrini reduced bottles from 150cl to 125cl, and reduced alcohol content further to 6% ABV.

Marketing

Although Lambrini is not a wine but a perry, it is a marketed more in the style of a wine than a traditional perry or cider. Its marketing is targeted at women. The Committee of Advertising Practice published a new edition of their advertising code in 2005, and the campaign for Lambrini was the first to be found non-compliant. The Advertising Standards Authority banned the ad in question for implying that the drink may bring sexual or social success.

The advertising for the product was changed in 2015 from the slogan "Lambrini girls just wanna have fun", by launching a new "Bring the Brini" marketing campaign.

Implicitly it has been associated with so-called chav-culture in Britain.

See also
Babycham

References

External links

British alcoholic drinks
Companies based in Liverpool
Alcoholic drink brands